The Alpine Convention is an international territorial treaty for the sustainable development of the Alps. The objective of the treaty is to protect the natural environment of the Alps while promoting its development. This Framework Convention involves the European Union and eight states (Austria, Germany, France, Italy, Liechtenstein, Monaco, Slovenia, and Switzerland). Opened to signature in 1991 and consisting of a Framework Convention, various implementation protocols and declarations, it entered into force in 1995, contributing to reinforce the recognition of special qualities and specific characteristics of the Alps, going beyond national boundaries and seeking international action.

Geographic area of the Alpine Convention 

The geographic area of the Alpine Convention covers a  encompassing 5867 municipalities (data from 2013).
The entire territories of Monaco and Liechtenstein are included. Austria and Italy together represent more than 55% of the convention area. With France, these three states cover the three-quarter of the total surface of the Alpine Convention territory.
In 2013, the total population of this area was approaching 15 million inhabitants.

The Institutions of the Alpine Convention

The Alpine Conference 
The Alpine Conference is the body that takes the most important decisions regarding the convention. The presidency of the conference rotates between the contracting parties, each holding the presidency for a two-year period. For the period 2016–2018 the presidency is held by Austria.

The conference also welcomes the following observers: European association of elected representatives from mountain regions, Alpe Adria, Arge Alp, International Commission for the Protection of the Alps (CIPRA) International, Club Arc Alpin, COTRAO – The Working Community of the Western Alps, Euromontana, FIANET, the International Steering Committee of the Network of Protected areas, the IUCN, the Managing Authority of the European Cooperation Programme Alpine Space, Pro Mont Blanc, UNEP and ISCAR.

All the Alpine Conferences:

The permanent committee 
The permanent committee is the executive body of the Alpine Conference. It is composed of all member delegations and guarantees that the basis, the principles and the objectives of the convention are implemented.
The permanent committee analyses the information submitted by the member states in implementing the convention and reports to the Alpine Conference; prepares programmes for meetings of the Alpine Conference and proposes the agenda; sets up working groups that have to formulate Protocols and recommendations and it coordinates their activities; examines and harmonizes the contents of draft Protocols and makes proposals to the Alpine Conference.

The permanent committee meets twice a year.

The Compliance Committee 
The compliance committee is the body that oversees implementation of the commitments and obligations taken under the Alpine Convention. Every 10 years, Contracting Parties have to publish a report concerning the implementation of the convention and its protocols. The first report was adopted at the Xth Alpine Conference (March 2009).

The Permanent Secretariat 
This treaty dedicated to a specific territory is supported by a permanent secretariat, created in 2003, that has its main office in Innsbruck, Austria, and a branch office in Bolzano-Bozen, Italy. 
The role of this permanent secretariat is to support all the other bodies instituted by the Alpine Convention by providing professional, logistic and administrative support, and by helping the Contracting parties, especially in implementing projects. The secretariat is headed by a secretary general, currently Alenka Smerkolj.

The permanent secretariat carries out different projects and activities for promotion of the Alpine Convention.

Working groups and platforms 
The permanent committee can establish Working Groups, with a two-year mandate, on topics it considers relevant to support the sustainable development within the Alps. The main responsibility of the working groups and platforms is the development of new protocols, recommendations and implementation measures, studies of ongoing developments and reports on the progress to the Alpine Conference and permanent committee.

Nine working groups and platforms are currently active:
 Working Group Transport
 Natural Hazards Platform
 Ecological Network Platform
 Water Management Platform in the Alpine space
 Large Carnivores and Wild Ungulates and Society Platform – WISO
 Working Group "Macro-regional strategy for the Alps"
 "Mountain Farming" Platform
 "Mountain Forest" Working group
 "Sustainable tourism" Working group

Working groups active in the past were:
 Working Group UNESCO World Heritage
 Expert Group -Report from the State of the Alps-
 Working Group "Demography and Employment"

Signatures and ratifications of the Framework Convention and its Protocols 

The first meeting of interested countries took place in Berchtesgaden in December 1989.  On 7 the Framework Convention was signed by Austria, Germany, France, Italy, Liechtenstein and Switzerland. Slovenia signed on 29 and Monaco on 20. Ratification occurred between 1994 and 1999.
Below is a brief overview about the signatures and the state of ratifications:

To date, Alpine states have signed all the protocols, except Monaco that did not sign the protocol 'Energy' and the European Union that did not sign the protocols 'Mountain Forests' and 'Settlement of disputes'. Regarding protocol ratification, Switzerland has not ratified any protocols yet.

Protocols and Declarations linked to the Framework Convention 
Under the convention, Member States should adopt specific measures in twelve thematic areas (Population and Culture, Spatial Planning, Air pollution, Soil Conservation, Water Management, Conservation of Nature and the Countryside, Mountain Farming, Mountain Forests, Tourism, Transport, Energy, and Waste Management). Of these areas, eight are now protocols annexed to the Framework Convention:
Spatial Planning and Sustainable Development;
Mountain Farming;
Conservation of Nature and Landscape Protection;
Mountain Forests;
Tourism;
Soil Conservation;
Energy;
Transports.

Two new protocols, not related to a specific thematic area, have since been adopted:
 Settlement of disputes;
Adherence of the Principality of Monaco to the Alpine Convention.

The Alpine Convention includes two Declarations that could not been turned into Protocols:
 Declaration on Population and Culture;
 Declaration on Climate Change.

Publications of the Permanent Secretariat of the Alpine Convention 

 Alpine Signals 1. The Alpine Convention- Reference guide, 2010, second edition, available in English, German, French, Italian and Slovenian.
 Alpine Signals 2. The Alpine Convention is taking shape, 2004, available in German, French, Italian and Slovenian.
 Alpine Signals 3. Cross-border ecological network, 2004, available in German, French, Italian and Slovenian.
 Alpine Signals 4. Natural events documentation, 2006, available in German, French, Italian and Slovenian.
 Alpine Signals 5. Mitigation and adaptation to climate change in the Alpine Space, 2008
 Alpine Signals 6
 Report on the State of the Alps #1. Transport and Mobility, 2007
 Report on the State of the Alps #2. Water and water management issues, 2009
 Report on the State of the Alps #3. Sustainable rural development and innovation, 2011
 Report on the State of the Alps #4. Sustainable tourism in the Alps, 2013
 Report on the State of the Alps #5. Demographic changes in the Alps, 2015
 Report on the State of the Alps #6. Greening the economy in the Alpine region, 2017
 Towards Renewable Alps . Towards Renewable Alps, 2017
 Multi-Annual Work Programme of the Alpine Conference 2017–2022. Multi-Annual Work Programme of the Alpine Conference 2017–2022, 2017
 The Alps-Eight countries, a single territory, 2009; second edition, 2016
 PER ALPES. Discovering the Alps in 20 circular walks, 2010
 THE ALPS. People and pressures in the mountains, the facts at a glance. Vademecum, 2010
 Establishing an Alpine Ecological Network, 2007
 Alpine Signals FOCUS 1
 Implementation manuals of the Alpine Convention and best practice
 Environmental Protection and Mountains

See also 
 List of national parks of the Alps
 Alpine Space Programme, an EU co-funded programme to enhance the competitiveness and attractiveness of the alpine region

References

External links 
 Alpine Convention
 CIPRA-International

Alps
Climate change policy
Environmental treaties
Treaties concluded in 1991
Environment of Europe
Treaties entered into force in 1995
1995 in the environment
Treaties of Austria
Treaties of Switzerland
Treaties of Germany
Treaties of France
Treaties of Liechtenstein
Treaties of Italy
Treaties of Monaco
Treaties of Slovenia
Treaties entered into by the European Union